Charles John Blood Meacham (20 December 1850 – 16 January 1930) was an English organist and composer.

Education

Charles John Blood Meacham, was born on 20 December 1850 and baptised on 2 February 1851. He was the son of John Meacham (1819–1887) and Elizabeth Blood (1814–1877). He was educated at St John’s College, Cambridge where he was awarded Mus.B. in 1871. He then trained at Ely Cathedral.

He married Eliza Melson on 28 August 1877 in Lapworth Parish Church. They had one son, Hugh St. Alban Meacham (1881–1967).

He died on 16 January 1930 in Edgbaston, Birmingham. A legacy from his estate was used to create The C J B Meacham Trust, which is now administered by the Diocese of Coventry. It provides credit to the Diocesan stipends fund.

Appointments

Organist of St Philips Church, Birmingham 1871–1888
Organist of St George's Church, Edgbaston 1888–1930

Compositions

He wrote 
Song: Oh lady, leave they silken thread 1878
Song: Lead kindly light 1879
Anthem: Come unto me 1883
Benedictus and Agnus Dei 1886
Song: England’s Glory 1889
Solemn Processional March 1893. 
Andante Religioso 1894
Anthem: It is a good thing to give thanks 1896
Magnificat and Nunc Dimittis in F 1896
Anthem: The Lord is my Shepherd

References

1850 births
1930 deaths
English organists
British male organists
English composers
Alumni of St John's College, Cambridge